Sunset Pass is a 1933 American pre-Code Western film directed by Henry Hathaway and starring Randolph Scott, Tom Keene, Harry Carey, and Noah Beery. The picture was based on a Zane Grey novel, along with several other theatrical films with similar casts (including Randolph Scott, Harry Carey and Noah Beery) also based upon Zane Grey novels directed by Hathaway in 1933.

Cast
Randolph Scott as Ash Preshton
Tom Keene as Jack Rock/Jim Collins
Kathleen Burke as Jane Preston
Harry Carey as John Hesbitt
Noah Beery, Sr. as Marshal Blake
Kent Taylor as Clink Peeples
George Barbier as Judge

Original 1929 version
Sunset Pass was a remake of a lost 1929 version directed by Otto Brower and starring Jack Holt, Nora Lane, and John Loder.

1946 remake
A second remake was released on October 1, 1946, starring James Warren as "Rocky" and Nan Leslie as Jane Preston.

References

External links

1933 films
Films based on works by Zane Grey
Films directed by Henry Hathaway
Paramount Pictures films
1933 Western (genre) films
American black-and-white films
American Western (genre) films
1930s English-language films
1930s American films